Islam: What the West Needs to Know is a 2006 documentary film produced by Quixotic Media. It features discussions using passages from religious texts and includes commentaries by Robert Spencer, Serge Trifkovic, Bat Ye'or, Abdullah Al-Araby, and Walid Shoebat. The film premiered at the American Film Renaissance Festival in Hollywood on January 15, 2006, and had a limited theatrical release in Chicago, Washington, D.C., and Atlanta in summer 2006.

Critical reception
While some reviewers have had a positive reception to the film, others have criticised the film as being inaccurate, simplistic, biased and propagandist against Islam. The Chicago Tribunes reviewer, Michael Phillips, describes it as a "deadly dull anti-Islam propaganda piece". The Washington City Papers reviewer, Louis Bayard, argues that "If [the directors] Davis and Daly had a little imagination, they might see that the devil they’re chasing isn't Islam but fundamentalism, which assumes many forms." The film has been described as an "anti-Muslim documentary" in the context of the counter-jihad movement.

See also

 Islamophobia
 Criticism of Islam
 Islamic terrorism
 Propaganda Film

References

External links
 Islam: What the West Needs to Know. Official website.

2006 films
American documentary films
2006 documentary films
Documentary films critical of Islam
Documentary films about jihadism
2006 in Islam
American propaganda films
Anti-Islam works
2000s English-language films
2000s American films
Counter-jihad